Rivière du Rempart is a district of Mauritius, located in the North-East of the island, having an area of 147.6 km². The population estimate was at 108,005 as at 31 December 2015.

History

Places of interest

Places
The Rivière du Rempart District include different regions; however, some regions are further divided into different suburbs.

 Amaury (Southern part in Flacq district)
 Amitié-Gokhoola (Western part in Pamplemousses district)
 Barlow
 Belle Vue Maurel 
 Brisée-Verdière (Southern part in Flacq district)
 Cap Malheureux
 Cottage
 Espérance Trébuchet
 Goodlands
 Grand-Bay (Western part in Pamplemousses district)
 Grand-Gaube
 Le Vale
 Mapou (Southern part in Pamplemousses district)
 Panchavati
 Petit Raffray
 Piton (Western part in Pamplemousses district)
 Plaines des Roches (Southern part in Flacq district)
 Pointe de Lascars
 Poudre d'Or
 Poudre d'Or Hamlet
 Rivière-du-Rempart
 Roche-Terre
 Roches-Noires (Southern part in Flacq district)
 Villebague (Western part in Pamplemousses district and Southern part in Flacq district)

Education

List of secondary schools in Rivière du Rempart
 Northfields International High School, Mapou.
 Ramsoondur Prayag State Secondary School, Rivière du Rempart
 Simadree Virasawmy State Secondary School, Rivière du Rempart
 Universal College, Rivière du Rempart
 Ideal College, Rivière du Rempart
 Beekrumsing Ramlallah State Secondary School, Mapou 
 Piton State College, Piton
 Sharma Jugdambi State Secondary School, Goodlands
 Goodlands State Secondary School (Boys), Goodlands
 Friendship College (Boys and Girls), Goodlands
 Adolf de Plevitz State Secondary School, Grand Bay

See also

 Districts of Mauritius
 List of places in Mauritius

References 

 
Districts of Mauritius